Pseudopassive or pseudo-passive may refer to:

 Impersonal passive voice, a grammatical form that deletes the subject of an intransitive verb
 Prepositional passive, a form of English passive voice in which the object of a preposition becomes the subject of a clause

See also
 Passive voice, a grammatical form in which an object becomes a subject
 Passive (disambiguation)